Cyperus entrerianus, commonly known as the woodrush flatsedge, is a species of sedge that is native to southern parts of North America, Central America, and parts of South America.

The species was first formally described by the botanist Johann Otto Boeckeler in 1878.

See also
List of Cyperus species

References

entrerianus
Taxa named by Johann Otto Boeckeler
Plants described in 1878
Flora of Mexico
Flora of Argentina
Flora of Bolivia
Flora of Brazil
Flora of Colombia
Flora of Cuba
Flora of Jamaica
Flora of Paraguay
Flora of Uruguay
Flora of Venezuela
Flora without expected TNC conservation status